Jump In! is a 2007 Disney Channel Original Movie, which premiered on January 12, 2007. It was released on Disney Channel UK on April 27, 2007. The film, starring Corbin Bleu and Keke Palmer, revolves around a young boxer, Izzy Daniels (Bleu), who trains to follow in his father's footsteps by winning the Golden Glove. When his friend, Mary (Palmer), asks him to substitute for a team member in a Double Dutch tournament, Izzy discovers his new love for the sport. At the same time, he discovers true love in Mary and he deals with the conflict between him and his father about boxing. Filming took place from June–July 2006 in Toronto, Ontario, Canada.

Plot 

Isadore "Izzy" Daniels (Corbin Bleu) is a star boxer in Brooklyn, hoping to win the Golden Gloves, like his father and coach Kenneth (David Reivers). Izzy competes in an exhibition match against Rodney (Patrick Johnson Jr.), his classmate and the neighborhood bully, and wins using strategy and focus, giving him a chance to go to the Golden Gloves.

Izzy's neighbor, Mary Thomas (Keke Palmer), is a competitive Double Dutch player on a team called the Joy Jumpers; though the two often argue with each other, their friends know that they have mutual crushes. Izzy brings his younger sister, Karin (Kylee Russell), and her friends to the Double Dutch regional competition, to watch Mary and her teammates, Shauna (Shanica Knowles), Keisha (Laivan Greene), and Yolanda (Jajube Mandiela). Though Izzy tries to hide it, he enjoys the competition. The Joy Jumpers take fourth place, barely qualifying for the city finals. Upset with Mary's freestyle choreography, Yolanda leaves the team and joins their main competitors, the Dutch Dragons. The Joy Jumpers need to find another teammate, or they can't compete in the city finals. Not taking Double Dutch seriously, Izzy mocks them. Mary then challenges him to jump rope and prove that it's easy. Izzy does so, having done jump roping to train for boxing. The girls convince Izzy to be a temporary replacement until they can find someone else, and he secretly practices with the Joy Jumpers before school at his father's gym.

Over several days, Izzy spends more time with the Joy Jumpers and improves tremendously at Double Dutch, though his boxing skills and punctuality suffer as a result. His fellow boxer, Tammy (Rebecca Williams), finds out but promises to keep it a secret if he stops teasing her. With some help from Izzy, the Joy Jumpers are able to put together a better freestyle routine. Izzy agrees to join the team permanently, and suggests they change the name to Hot Chili Steppers instead, to which Mary agrees. Izzy plans to perform with them at a Double Dutch exhibition to practice their routine. That day, though, Izzy's dad shows up with tickets to a boxing match. Reluctant to tell the truth, Izzy goes with his dad, bailing on Mary and the Hot Chili Steppers. Upset, Mary kicks him off the team, ignoring his apologies.

Rodney, meanwhile, is furious over losing to Izzy, and demands a rematch, though Izzy ignores him. He discovers Izzy's secret, and takes pictures of him, leaving them all over their school, exposing and ridiculing Izzy. After seeing this, Mary tries to convince Izzy to come back, but Izzy coldly turns her down. Kenneth gives Izzy a gift for his boxing match, but discovers the pictures Rodney posted and confronts Izzy about it. Izzy admits that he didn't tell his dad because ever since Izzy's mother died, all he ever talks about is boxing. Izzy admits that he no longer likes the sport, and only does it for his father. Izzy apologizes, while Kenneth accepts the apology, then leaves the room.

Izzy takes out his anger at the gym until Tammy comes over and reminds him that she's been teased by him and others constantly for being a female boxer, but she's overcome it to become the best girl boxer in Brooklyn. That night, Rodney shows up at the gym with a large crowd. He demands again that Izzy gives him the rematch, and Izzy agrees. In the ring, Izzy responds to Rodney's mockery with cool analysis of Rodney’s behavior as a loudmouthed bully. He uses the tricks he honed in freestyle practice to dodge Rodney's attacks and push him against the ropes repeatedly, finally stating that they both had a lot to be mad about, but fighting would not improve matters. He leaves the ring, and Rodney angrily follows, but trips and falls. Everyone urges Izzy to finish him, but he refuses before leaving the gym. Rodney is impressed, admiring Izzy for standing up to him.

The Hot Chili Steppers come to the city finals with an abysmal replacement until Izzy shows up. He apologizes and Mary forgives him. The Dutch Dragons show up, with Yolanda and their leader, Gina (Paula Brancati), making snarky comments toward Mary and her teammates. Mary shows a new attitude, not letting it get to her. During the compulsory competition, the Steppers stun the Dragons by taking first place, while the Dragons take second. The Dragons take first in the speed competition, while the Steppers take second, which means the Freestyle round is the tiebreaker. Tammy shows up with Izzy's friends, Chuck and Earl (Mazin Elsadig and Micah Williams), to support the Hot Chili Steppers. Rodney also comes to watch. Just before the freestyle routine, Izzy is surprised to see his father and Karin. The Hot Chili Steppers take the stage, with Izzy showing the skills he's learned, impressing his friends and family. After they finish their performance, Kenneth apologizes to Izzy, explaining that boxing was his way to stay close to Izzy after they lost Izzy's mom. He tells Izzy that he's proud of him, and the two make amends. Rodney also tells Izzy that he's impressed by the Double Dutch, and hopes Izzy can show him the moves he made in the ring. Izzy agrees, and they call a truce.

The results are announced, and the Dutch Dragons take second place. Before the winner is revealed, the screen suddenly freezes and cuts to a group of kids at the boxing gym, who are listening to Izzy's story narrated by Rodney. He tells them that the Hot Chili Steppers went to state, but didn't win until the next year, and Mary and Izzy are still together. As he sends the kids to gear up, Rodney remembers that day, revealing that the Hot Chili Steppers won. They happily accept their first-place trophy, stunning the Dutch Dragons. The movie ends with the Hot Chili Steppers and Karin teaching Kenneth how to Double Dutch.

Cast
 Corbin Bleu as Isadore "Izzy" Daniels, a boxer and son of a widowed golden gloves champion. He joins Mary's Double Dutch team after Yolanda quits. He is bullied by Rodney Tyler, who is insecure, and he pretends to like fighting because of his friends.
 Keke Palmer as Mary Thomas, the leader of the Joy Jumpers (later turned Hot Chili Steppers), she does Double Dutch and hopes to get into the city finals. She and Izzy later on become attracted to each other.
 David Reivers as Kenneth Daniels, former boxer and Izzy's widowed father. Reivers is Corbin Bleu's father in real life.
 Shanica Knowles as Shauna Lewis, a member of the Joy Jumpers and Mary's best friend.
 Patrick Johnson Jr. as Rodney Tyler, the school bully who wants the golden gloves as much as Izzy. He has a lot of problems at home and Izzy hates fighting him because it does them no good.
 Laivan Greene as Keisha Ray, another member of the Joy Jumpers and Mary's other best friend.
 Kylee Russell as Karin Daniels, Izzy's Double Dutch-crazy sister.
 Rebecca Williams as Tammy Lewis, the only girl boxer at the Daniels' gym. Although she is picked on by Izzy's friends, she stands strong and loves boxing. She thinks of herself as one of the guys and doesn't care what people think of her because she likes being herself. She helps Izzy with his problems and gives him advice after people start harassing him because he grows into liking Double Dutch. She has a crush on Chuck.
 Jajube Mandiela as Yolanda Brooks, Mary's ex-best friend who joins the Dutch Dragons because she wants to be a winner more than being Mary's friend.
 Micah Williams as Earl "L'il Earl" Jackson, a boxer at the gym and one of Izzy's best friends. He has a joking personality.
 Harrison Hapin as Jump Rope #1
 Mazin Elsadig as Chuck Coley, a boxer at the gym and one of Izzy's best friends. He has a crush on Tammy.
 Paula Brancati as Gina, the arrogant and snarky leader of the Dutch Dragons, the four-time regional champions of Double Dutch. She takes joy in every opportunity she gets to belittle Mary and her team.
 Gene A. Mack as Felix, the gym's wise referee and training coach.

Production
The film was originally set to star Raven-Symoné and be named Double Dutch, but due to Symoné's busy schedule at the time, it was later revamped into Jump In! with Corbin Bleu.

Actress and singer China Anne McClain, who later went on to star in the Disney Channel series A.N.T. Farm, auditioned for and won an undisclosed role in the film but turned it down to instead star in the television series Tyler Perry's House of Payne as Jazmine Payne, after catching Tyler Perry's attention.

Jump In! is the 69th Disney Channel Original Movie and went into production in 2006. Earlier titles for the film included "Jump", "Jump In" and "Jump Start", with some early trailers even showing the "Jump Start" title.

In the movie, Izzy Daniels is in a group called the Hot Chili Steppers. This is an obvious parody of Red Hot Chili Peppers, a real-life rock band. The version in Spanish dubs the name Salto Extrapicante.

Promotion for the film began in the Summer of 2006, with a poster appearing in the program for the High School Musical Tour. Advertisements highlighted Corbin Bleu's association with High School Musical and ran heavily during re-airings of that film. Several videos from the film were also put into heavy rotation on Disney Channel, airing during breaks in regular programming.

Corbin Bleu became very good at jumping and even performed some of his own stunts like the donkey kick and push-ups, but he did have a stunt double for some of the jumping like backflips and individual jumping. At the end of the movie, Andy Royalle makes a guest appearance as one of the jump-ropers. During the final contest, an actual champion Double Dutch team from Brooklyn makes a cameo. They just happened to be in Toronto for a tournament at the same time the movie was being filmed.

Jump In! was the last Disney Channel Original Movie to use the 2002–2007 Disney Channel Movie intro; later DCOM films used the remixed version.

The story of Jump In! was originally written by Sherwyn Smith, who now works as a teacher at an elite private school on the Upper East Side of New York.

Reception

Jump In! broke the record previously set by The Cheetah Girls 2 as the highest rated DCOM premiere with 8.2 million viewers. At the time it marked Corbin Bleu's second #1 hit for the Disney Channel and Keke Palmer's first. Its ratings record for highest rated DCOM was beat out for later that year by High School Musical 2 (in which Corbin Bleu also starred) on August 17, 2007, which gained 17.24 million viewers, making it Bleu's third #1 hit DCOM.

Accolades

The film won and was nominated for a number of awards throughout 2007.

Special screenings 
 Jump In! and Dance It to the Limit: A special screening of the movie with a special dance-along to Push It to the Limit, hosted by the male announcer of Disney Channel.
 Jump In! Jab & Gab: A special screening of the movie, in which viewers play the online game, Jab & Gab and send shout-outs to their friends, family or the cast of the movie.
 Jump In! Pop up Edition: Gives viewers an inside look on different parts of the movie, while popping up on your television. This special screening aired Friday, June 1 on Disney Channel.

Home media

The DVD release of Jump In! carried the subtitle "Freestyle Edition" and was released on April 3, 2007. And July 2, 2007 in the United Kingdom.

Special features include the following:
 Keke Palmer's "Jumpin'" Music Video
 T-Squad's "Vertical" Music Video
 Behind the Scenes Featurette - "Learning the Moves"
 Making of Featurette - "Inside the Ropes"
Rooa Abdelrahim and Alyssa Gallagher, who appeared in High School Musical (1 and 2), made a cameo in this film during the song "Push It To The Limit"; the two also appeared in the fighting match between Izzy and Rodney.

Soundtrack

A soundtrack featuring songs from the movie was released on January 9, 2007. It debuted at #5 on the Billboard 200 on January 27, 2007, with 49,000 copies sold, and rose to #3 in the next week, selling 57,000 copies. In its third week, it fell to number nine with 44,000 copies sold. In February 2007, the album was certified Gold by the RIAA. As of July 8, 2008 the album has sold over 600.000+ copies within the U.S.

Frank Fitzpatrick composed the original score for the film and wrote and produced two songs for the soundtrack, including the single "Jump to the Rhythm", a co-production with Nashville’s Keith Thomas featuring Jordan Pruitt.

Track listing
 "It's On" - NLT
 "It's My Turn Now" - Keke Palmer
 "Push It to the Limit" - Corbin Bleu
 "Vertical" - T-Squad
 "Where Do I Go From Here" - Sebastian Mego
 "Jump to the Rhythm" - Jordan Pruitt
 "Jumpin’" - Keke Palmer
 "Go (Jump In! Mix)" - Jupiter Rising
 "I’m Ready" - Drew Seeley
 "Gotta Lotta" - Prima J
 "Live It Up" - Jeannie Ortega
 "Jump" - Lil' Josh
 "Let It Go" - Kyle

Charts

Weekly charts

Year-end charts

Certifications

Notes

External links 
 Official Disney DVD website
 

Disney Channel Original Movie films
American teen comedy-drama films
2007 romantic comedy-drama films
2007 television films
2007 films
Teen sports films
2000s teen comedy-drama films
Davis Entertainment films
2000s English-language films
Films directed by Paul Hoen
American sports comedy-drama films
American boxing films
Films produced by John Davis
Films set in Brooklyn
Films shot in Toronto
2000s sports comedy-drama films
American drama television films
2000s American films